Merodio is one of eight parishes (administrative divisions) in Peñamellera Baja, a municipality within the province and autonomous community of Asturias, located in northern Spain. 

The population was 90 in 2013.

References

Parishes in Peñamellera Baja